Ron or Ronald Smith may refer to:

In sports
Ron Smith (defensive back) (1943–2013), American NFL player
Ron C. Smith (born 1942), American football player
Ron Smith (wide receiver) (born 1956), American NFL player
Ron Smith (defensive tackle) (born 1978), American NFL player
Ron Smith (footballer, born 1929) (1929–2010), English professional footballer
Ron Smith (footballer, born 1936), English professional footballer
Ron Smith (footballer, born 1949), professional football (soccer) player and coach
Ron Smith (Australian footballer, born 1916) (1916–1979), Australian footballer for Essendon and North Melbourne
Ron Smith (Australian footballer, born 1917) (1917–1998), Australian footballer for Collingwood
Ron Smith (Australian footballer, born 1934) (1934–2009), Australian footballer for Fitzroy
Ron Smith (Australian footballer, born 1937), Australian footballer for Geelong
Ron Smith (ice hockey, born 1952), Canadian former professional hockey player and mayor
Ron Smith (ice hockey, born 1944) (1944–2017), ice hockey coach
Ron Smith (bridge), American bridge player
Ronald Smith (boxer) (1944–2011), British boxer
Ronald Smith (cricketer) (1926–2001), English cricketer
Ronnie Ray Smith (1949–2013), American athlete
Ronnie Robinson (roller derby) (1939–2001), or Ronald Smith, roller derby skater

Other 
 Ron Smith (American poet) (21st century), American poet born in Georgia
 Ron Smith (comics) (1928–2019), British comic artist
 Ron Smith (Canadian author) (born 1943), Canadian author, poet and publishing house founder
 Ron Smith (radio host) (1941–2011), American talk radio show host in Baltimore
 Ron Smith (trade unionist) (1915–1999), British trade union leader
 Ronald Smith (musician) (1922–2004), British pianist and composer
 Ronald Smith (politician) (1855–1909), Australian politician
 Ronald Allen Smith (born 1957), Canadian man on death row in Montana
 Ronald Bert Smith, Jr. (1971–2016), American murderer executed by Alabama
 Ron Clinton Smith (born 1951), American actor
 Ron Smith (peace activist) (1921–1995), New Zealand public servant, communist and peace activist
 Ron Smith (firearms designer) (born 1951), American small arms designer
 Ronald L. Smith, American children's book author
 Ronald Smith (meteorologist), American professor of meteorology
 Ron Smith (television) (born 1966), American director, voice actor and animator
 Ronald B. Smith (1907–1984), American mechanical and consulting engineer